Rosetta Stone Inc. is an American education technology software company that develops language, literacy and brain-fitness software. Best known for its  language-learning products, in 2013, the company expanded beyond language into education-technology with its acquisitions of Livemocha, Lexia Learning, Fit Brains, and Tell Me More. In 2021, it became a subsidiary of IXL Learning.

History

Beginnings 
According to the company, founder Allen Stoltzfus learned German through immersion while living in Germany and found it relatively easy. In the 1980s, Stoltzfus began learning Russian in a classroom setting, but found the classroom setting much more difficult. He wanted to simulate the German experience, and he decided to use computer technology to create a similar learning experience. He enlisted the aid of his brother-in-law, John Fairfield, who held a PhD in computer science.

By 1992, CD-ROM technology made the project possible. Allen and John, along with Eugene Stoltzfus (Allen's brother), formed a company known as Fairfield Language Technologies in Harrisonburg, Virginia.  They hired Greg Keim and Michael Silverman along with other significant team members. They released their software product under the title The Rosetta Stone.

2000s and IPO 
In 2003, the company announced the hiring of Tom Adams, a businessman with international experience, as President and CEO.

In 2004, Rosetta Stone Ltd. established its Endangered Language Program to contract with endangered language communities interested in custom software development to support language revitalization efforts.

In 2006, the company changed names to Rosetta Stone, Ltd., and converted from an S corporation to a C corporation. Ownership transferred to investment firms ABS Capital Partners and Norwest Equity Partners.

On September 23, 2008, Rosetta Stone Inc. filed an Initial public offering with the Securities and Exchange Commission. On April 15, 2009, the company was listed as the Rosetta Stone on the New York Stock Exchange, raising $112 million in its initial public offering of stock shares. In its first full day of trading on the New York Stock Exchange, the stock gained 39% from its opening price. After a strong opening, however, the stock stumbled amid reports of weaknesses in Rosetta Stone's US business, resulting in the cancellation of a second offering, and a disappointing year end price just 5 cents off its opening price. The stock trades under ticker symbol RST. As of December 2015, the stock was at approximately $29.2 (USD) per share.

2010s
In 2013, it acquired four companies—Vivity Labs Inc (creators of the Fit Brains Trainer), Livemocha, Tell Me More, and Lexia Learning.

On September 17, 2013, Rosetta Stone announced the launch of a new Kids Division. In November 2014, it debuted its first kids reading program for consumers, Rosetta Stone Kids Reading.

Since 2016, the company's president and CEO has been John Hass.

Rosetta Stone is transitioning to a cloud-based business model that goes beyond language learning and deeper into education technology.

Acquisition by Cambium 
On August 31, 2020, Rosetta Stone announced that they had entered an agreement to be acquired by Cambium Learning Group for $792 million.

Acquisition by IXL Learning 
On March 17, 2021, Rosetta Stone was acquired by IXL Learning from Cambium Learning Group.

Offices
Corporate headquarters are in Arlington, Virginia.
There are also offices in Harrisonburg, Virginia; Boulder, Colorado; Austin, Texas; Seattle, Washington; Concord, Massachusetts; London, United Kingdom; and Seoul, South Korea.

References

External links
 Rosetta Stone website
 Rosetta Stone factsheet — Hoover's
 Rosetta Stone company profile — Google Finance
 "Rosetta Stone Inc. IPO"
 

Companies based in Arlington County, Virginia
Companies formerly listed on the New York Stock Exchange
Software companies based in Virginia
Educational software companies
Private equity portfolio companies
Education companies established in 1992
Software companies established in 1992
1992 establishments in Virginia
2008 initial public offerings
Software companies of the United States
2020 mergers and acquisitions
2021 mergers and acquisitions